{{Infobox football club
| nickname(s) = |Al-Darawish (The Dervish)
|Barazil Masr (The Brazilians of Egypt)
|Al-Mangawia (The Mango Boys)
| founded =  as El Nahda Sporting Club| ground = Ismailia Stadium
| capacity = 30000
| clubname = Ismaily SC
| image = File:Ismaily-SC-300x300.png|thumb
| upright     = 0.7
| fullname = Ismaily Sporting Club
| chairman = Yahya El-Koumi
| manager = Mido (footballer)
| league = Egyptian Premier League
| season = 2021–22
| position = Egyptian Premier League, 9th
| pattern_la1 = _ismaily1920h
| pattern_b1 = _ismaily1920h
| pattern_ra1 = _ismaily1920h
| pattern_sh1 = _ismaily1920h
| pattern_so1 = _ismaily1920a
| leftarm1 = FFFC00
| body1 = FFFC00
| rightarm1 = FFFC00
| shorts1 = 000ADD
| socks1 = FFFFFF
| pattern_la2 = _ismaily1920a
| pattern_b2 = _ismaily1920a
| pattern_ra2 = _ismaily1920a
| pattern_sh2 = _ismaily1920a
| pattern_so2 = _ismaily1920h
| leftarm2 = FFFFFF
| body2 = FFFFFF
| rightarm2 = FFFFFF
| shorts2 = FFFFFF
| socks2 = 000ADD
| website = http://www.ismailyclub.org/
| current = 2022–23 Ismaily SC season
}}
Ismaily Sporting Club is an Egyptian professional football club, established on 20 March 1921 as El Nahda Sporting Club (Egyptian pronunciation: Nady El Nahda), based in Ismaïlia, Egypt. The club is best known for its football team. Also it's considered as an Egyptian National Club, where they helped the famous local tour of duty to play for the benefit of the homeland against the occupying armies. The club's nickname The Brazilians, is a reference to their uniforms, which echo those of the Brazil national team, and similar style of play.

Ismaily won the Egyptian Premier League three times in 1967, 1991 and 2002, as well as the Egyptian Cup in 1997 and 2000. In 1969 the club won the CAF Champions League. That event, the first for an Egyptian team, was so monumental at the time that in many ways it remains a legendary victory in the minds of a whole generation. The club reached the CAF Champions League final match in 2003, but lost to Nigerian club Enyimba FC.

History
It all started back in 1920, more than 100 years ago, when the idea of starting an Egyptian club in the city of Ismailia was born. In 1921, this dream became reality when the Nahda Sporting Club (now Ismaily) was founded thanks to generous donations and hard work. The Nahda was the first Egyptian club in the Canal zone; all other clubs were strictly foreign.

The club's location is where the Friday market is today. It wasn't until 1926 that the club became an official member of the Egyptian Football Federation. Ismaily is called the factory of stars, Ismaily produced great and famous players for Egypt.

The club is known in Egypt as well as its fans "El-Daraweesh"

They are well known for playing football but never score or achieve any championships, they usually lose in the semi final or Quarter Final or even first rounds of any championship.
i.e.: They lost in Egyptian cup 2008 – 2009 from a 2nd division team in the first round.

The club's initial state was quite modest. Inside the club's brick wall, there existed only a field of sand, one changing room, and a small hut. Of course, the residents of Ismailia were not satisfied; the hut was removed and replaced by a small building in 1931, and grass was planted on the pitch. Expansion continued in 1943, when the club purchased a 15,000 square-meter piece of land and moved there.

Building the club required money, and a total sum of 6453 L.E. was collected from local families and businesses. Here is a list of the most generous contributors:
Contractor Mohamed Ali Ahmed contributed 353 L.E.
Dr. Soleiman Eid and Saleh Eid contributed 500 L.E.
Hajj Mohamed Mohamed Soliman contributed 100 L.E.
Sayed Abu Zeid El Menyawy contributed 100 L.E.
Sheikh Ahmed Atta contributed 75 L.E.
Hajj Mohamed Sahmoud and Fahmy Michael contributed 30 L.E.
Hajj Ahmed Ali El Menyawy contributed 25 L.E.
Greek Panayiotis Fasolis contributed 20 L.E.

The first to game take place in the new pitch was between Ismaily and the English Army Team (Canal). The new club was officially opened on 11 April 1947. A celebration party was organized for this event. A friendly game was played on this day between Ismaily and the Farouk First Club (now Zamalek). Ismaily won the game 3/2.

Ismaily's lineup was: Yango, Sayed Abu Greisha, Salem Salem, Ali Hegazy, Anoos El Kebir, Mohamed Abdel Salam, Aly Lafy, Ahmed Mansour, Ibrahim Hablos, Sayed Charley, Awad Abdel Rahman.

The First Title
It wasn't until forty-four years after Ismaily was founded that the Daraweesh finally achieved their first title. Ismaily had been slowly climbing to the top after returning to the Premier League, but it all came together in the 66/67 season.

Salah Abu Greisha
Like every other League title Ismaily won, a long and hard battle was fought against Ahly, throughout the season. Ismaily secured the title however, after defeating Ahly by Ali Abu Greisha's penalty-spot goal, two weeks before the end of the season.

The 1966/67 season had 22 weeks. Ismaily won 15 games, tied 6, and lost one against Ahly. The Daraweesh scored 34 goals and conceded 17. Ali Abu Greisha was the leading scorer with 15 goals; Shehta, Sayed Abdel Razek, and Reeo scored 4 each; Sayed Hamed, El Araby, Tarboush, Mostafa Darwish, and Mohamed Maaty each scored once.

Coach Thompson
Salah Abu Greisha coached the team for the first half of the League, but after a few shaky performances, Eng. Osman Ahmed Osman traveled to London, and returned with Ismaily's first ever foreign coach: English Thompson. Thompson worked with Salah Abu Greisha to keep the team in top form.

Ismaily's results for the season:
Masry (3–1), (1–0)
Zamalek (1–1), (2–1)
Tayran (2–0), (1–1)
Ittihad (1–0), (2–1)
Domyat (2–0), (1–0)
Olympic Club (1–0, 3–1)
Ahly (1–3 [only defeat]), (1–0)
Suez (1–0), (0–0)
Seka (2–1), (1–0)

The African Victory
In 1969, Ismaily became the first Egyptian and Arab team to become the African Champion with the support of All league clubs' fans in the game that was held in Cairo Stadium.

After the League victory of 1967, Ismaily entered the African Champions League of 1969, despite gruelling local conditions following the war. Ismaily made it to the top, undefeated, and won the title in Cairo Stadium, which was packed over-capacity.

Ali Abu Greisha
Ismaily played 8 games, winning 5 of them and tieing three. A total of 22 goals were scored; Ali Abu Greisha scored 8, Sayed "Bazooka" scored 6, Amiro scored 4, Hendawy scored 2, and Anoos and Senary each scored 1. Only 9 goals were scored in Ismaily's goal. Ismaily was being coached by Ali Osman and Salah Abu Greisha at the time.

Ismaily also participated in the next African Champions League as defending Champion, and borrowed several players from other Egyptian clubs. Despite this, Ismaily was knocked out in the Semi-Finals by a Ghanaian team.

Ismaily then participated in the next tournament (the 7th), but was again eliminated by the same team. In the eighth tournament, Ismaily was eliminated early by the Ahly of Libya. In the ninth tournament, Ismaily made it to the Quarter Finals but was then forced to withdraw due to the October war.

Ismaily would not play any African championships for several years, until participating in the African Cup of Cup Winners. Ismaily was knocked out in the Semi-Finals by Ahly.

Ismaily participated in the Champions League again in 1990, but was eliminated in the Semi-Finals by Al Hilal of Sudan.

In 1995, in the Cup of Cup Winners, Ismaily was eliminated by Asec Abidjan after an embarrassing 5–1 loss. In the CAF Cup a few years later, Ismaily achieved second place, after Shabibat Al Kaba'il of Algeria after tieing 1–1 at home and 0–0 away.

Ismaily also participated in the Champions League in 2019 but was defeated in the group stage.

The Second Domestic Title
It took 24 years for Ismaily to win the League a second time. In the 1990/1991 season, Ismaily won their second Egyptian League title. Ismaily defeated Ahly, 2–0 in a decisive match in Mahala Stadium.

The competition was between Ahly ,Zamalek, and Ismaily. Ismaily played 35 matched, including the final match against Ahly ,. The team had 53 points, and scored 47 goals. The team won 20 matches:
Port Fouad (4–0)
Tersana (1–0)
Olympic (3–0)
Sekka (2–1), (1–0)
Mansoura (3–0)
Mahala (2–1)
Ittihad (4–0), (1–0)
Mokawiloon (3–0)
Al Minya (2–0)
Aswan (2–0), (1–0)
Al Kroum (1–0), (2–0)
Suez (3–0), (1–0)
Shibeen (1–0), (3–0)
Ahly (2–0) (decisive match)The team tied 13 matches against: Marreekh, Zamalek, Ahly, Mokawiloon, Mansoura (1–1); Al Minya, Mahala, Port Fouad, Olympic, Masry (0–0).

Ismaily lost twice, once to Ahly and once to Tersana, 1–0.

Fekry El Sagheer was the top scorer for the daraweesh, scoring a total of 13 goals. Besheer Abdel Samad scored 6, Atef Abdel Aziz scored 4, Yaser Ezzat and Hamza El Gamal scored 3, Ayman Ragab and Mohamed Salah Abu Greisha and Adham El Selehdar scored 2, and each of Shams Hamed, Hamadah Marzouk, Essam Abdel Al and Ahmed Kinawy scored 1.

The First Cup
Ismaily fans had experienced the League and the African Championship titles, so it was natural to expect a Cup victory soon. Ismaily won its first Cup title in the 1996–1997 season.

Ismaily faced several hard matches in the playoff. In the quarter finals, Ismaily faced Zamalek in Ismailia Stadium and barely managed a 4–3 victory, with the last goal being scored in extra time. Ahmed Fekry and Magdy el Sayad each scored two. Ismaily then faced Port Fouad, the Black Horse of the tournament. Ismaily defeated Port Fouad 2–0 in Port Said; Ahmed Fekry scored both.

The final game was against Ahly in Cairo Stadium. Almost all Egyptian football fans expected a Red victory. Earlier that season, Ahly had crushed Ismaily 6–0 at home, which had resulted in the replacement of the team's Board of Directors. It seemed that Ismaily was not ready to take on Ahly. The match also witnessed the return of star defender Hamza El Gamal, who had been playing in Kuwait for one year.

Surprisingly, Ismaily defeated Ahly, by Ahmed Fekry's famous goal: a beautiful shot from outside the 18-yard box.

Ismaily was coached by Ali Abu Greisha and Ismail Hefny at the time.

The Second Cup
Ismaily fans had to wait only three more years for the second Egyptian Cup victory. Ismaily was crowned Egyptian Cup Champion for the second time in history in the 1999–2000 season.

It seemed only fair that Ismaily should win at least this competition that season. Ismaily played an excellent season beginning the League's second half, and ended up second, narrowing the gap between them and Ahly to six points.

After that, however, the team was totally dedicated to winning the Cup. In the quarter finals, Ismaily defeated Mansoura 2–0 in Ismailia Stadium. The two goals were African: Mamado Kita scored the first and John Otaka added the second. In the semis, Ismaily faced Ahly in Ismailia in a historical game. Ismaily was fired up to win the Cup; Ahly wanted to avenge a 4–3 loss in the same stadium a few months prior to this game.

The match ended 4–2 for Ismaily. Mohamed Barakat and John Otaka each scored two goals.

In the finals, Ismaily met Mokawiloon, who had eliminated Zamalek in the semis. However, Mokawiloon was no match for Ismaily's spirit and talent, and despite playing an excellent match, lost 4–0. John Otaka and Barakat each scored once, and Mohamed Salah Abu Greisha scored two.

The following players participated in the Cup that season:
Abdel Kader El Brazy, Ibrahim Farag, Mohamed Sobhy, Islam El Shater, Ayman Ramadan, Emad El Nahas, Reda Seka, Mohamed Younis, Sayed Moawwad, Hamam Ibrahim, Mohamed Hommos, Hossam Abdel Al, Saad Abdel Baky, Ahmed Salem, Mohamed Barakat, Ayman El Gamal, Tarek Fahiem, Mamado Kita, John Otaka, Sayed Ghareib, Khaled Bebo, Mohamed Salah Abu Greisha.

Mohsen Saleh managed the team, and was assisted by Mahmoud Gaber and Besheer Abdel Samad.

Crest

 Honours 

 League 
Egyptian Premier League
Winners (3): 1966–67, 1990–91, 2001–02

 Cups 
Egypt Cup
Winners (2): 1996–97, 1999–2000

 African 
CAF Champions League
Winners (1): 1969

Performance in CAF competitions
PR = Preliminary round
FR = First round
SR = Second round
PO = Play-off round
QF = Quarter-final
SF = Semi-final

Notes

Recent seasons

Ground

The Ismailia Stadium is located in Ismailia, Egypt, and has a total capacity of 18,525 after the remodelation in 2009., then it was upgraded to 30,000 seats after the remodelation in 2019 for the 2019 Africa Cup of Nations, It is used by Ismaily SC, and was one of six stadiums used in the 2006 African Cup of Nations, 2019 Africa Cup of Nations and 2009 FIFA U-20 World Cup, held in Egypt.

Players
Current squad

Out on loan

Youth academy squad

Coaching staff

Managers

 Ángel Marcos (July 1, 1996 – June 97)
 Frank Engel (July 1, 1998 – June 30, 1999)
 Mohsen Saleh (Jan 1, 2000 – June 30, 2002)
 Jorvan Vieira (2001)
 Miroslav Maksimović (Oct 30, 2002 – Jan 1, 2003)
 Theo Bücker (2003)
 Muhsin Ertuğral (Jan 3, 2005 – May 1, 2005)
 Hans-Dieter Schmidt (May 21, 2005 – July 17, 2005)
 Theo Bücker (Dec 16, 2005 – June 30, 2006)
 Mark Wotte (June 2006 – December 30, 2006)
 Patrice Neveu (April 1, 2007 – Aug 1, 2007)
 Taha Basry (Aug 10, 2007 – Oct 2, 2007)
 Heron Ricardo Ferreira (Sept 29, 2008 – June 30, 2010)
 Nebojša Vučković (July 8, 2009 – Aug 22, 2009)
 Emad Soliman (Aug 22, 2009 – June 10, 2010)
 Mark Wotte (June 16, 2010 – April 21, 2011)
 Emad Soliman (April 22, 2011 – July 10, 2011)
 Hossam Hassan (Aug 9, 2011 – Sept 28, 2011)
 Mahmoud Gaber (Sept 28, 2011 – May 20, 2012)
 Sabri El Minyawi (May 26, 2012 – May 3, 2013)
 Mohamed Wahbah (May 4, 2013 – Oct 6, 2013)
 Shawky Gharieb (Oct 12, 2013 – Nov 26, 2013)
 Ahmed El-Agouz (Dec 17, 2013 – Feb 20, 2014)
 Heron Ricardo Ferreira (Feb 22, 2014 – Jan 5,2015)
 Tarek Yehia (Jan 7, 2015 – July 12, 2015)
 Ahmed Hossam Mido (July 15, 2015 – December 23, 2015)
 Nasreddine Nabi (Dec 31, 2015 – Jan 26, 2016)
 Khaled El-Kamash (Jan 26, 2016 – Aug 5, 2016)
 Emad Soliman (Jan 26, 2016 – Dec 2016)
 Frantisek Straka (Dec 2016 – Apr 20, 2017)
 Sébastien Desabre (Jul 10, 2017 – Dec 28, 2017)
 Abu Taleb al-Issawi (Dec 29, 2017 – Jan 22, 2018)
 Pedro Barny (Feb 1, 2018 – May 23, 2018)
 Kheïreddine Madoui (June 1, 2018 – Oct 4, 2018)
 Jorvan Vieira (Oct 4, 2018 – Dec 12 2018)
 Čedomir Janevski (Dec 15, 2018 – 24 April 2019)
 Mahmoud Gaber ( 26 April 2019 – 31 August 2019)
 Miodrag Ješić (August 31, 2019 – 1 December 2019)
 Adham Elslhdar (1 December 2019 – 7 January 2020)
 Didier Gomes Da Rosa (7 January 2020 – 25 August 2020)
 Adham Elslhdar (25 August 2020 – 4 September 2020)
 Heron Ricardo Ferreira (Sept 11, 2020 – Dec 21, 2020)
 Talaat Youssef (Dec 21, 2020 – Dec 24, 2020)
 Saafan El-Sagheer (Dec 24, 2020 – Jan 2021)
 Dragan Jović (Jan 29, 2021 – Mar 18, 2021)
 Ehab Galal (March 21, 2021 – August 23, 2021)
 Juan Brown ( November 10, 2021 – Feb 18, 2022)
 Hamad Ibrahim (February 21, 2022 – May 2, 2022)
 Hamza El-Gamal (May 3, 2022 –)

Families in Ismaily SC History

Osman Family

The Osman Ahmed Osman family has played a major role in the development of the club. Five out of the club's six tournaments were won under the leadership of an Osman-family member.
The club's first golden era, in which two tournaments were secured (Egyptian League and African Champions League), was established under the leadership of Osman Ahmed Osman, who continued to reside as President of the club for several years after that. Between 1996–2004, the Osman family entered the scene. This time, it was the second generation of Osman's leading the club. Osman Ahmed Osman's nephew, Ismail Osman, acted as Club President and Chairman of the Board of Directors, while three of Osman's sons, Ibrahim Osman, Ahmed Osman, and Mahmoud Osman, held seats in the Board. In particular, Ibrahim Osman held the post of Vice President and was given the responsibility of running the club's football team and youth school. During this period, the team effectively doubled its tournament chest by winning three tournaments: the Egyptian Cup twice (1997, 2000) and the Egyptian League once (2002). In addition, the team became a powerful regional/continental force, reaching advanced stages of several African club competitions (2nd place in CAF Cup 2000, semi-finals of CAF Cup Winner's Cup 2001, and the 2nd place in CAF Champions League 2003, as well 2nd place in the first Arab Champions League, 2004). Most of this team's players ended up either abroad or at the two local rivals (Ahly/Zamalek), sometimes after an expired contract and sometimes after a direct sale. The club also fell victim to massive financial problems, prompting the resignation of the Osman family. Fans have debated fiercely about this sequence of events, with some blaming the Osman family for the club's problems, while others defending the administration as a highlight in the club's history. Since no tournaments have been achieved since their departure, many fans currently call for a return of Osman administration.
Osman Ahmed Osman
Ismail Osman
Ibrahim Osman

Greisha Family
Adel Abou Greisha
Ahmed Abou Greisha
Ali Abo Greisha
Atef Abou Greisha
Awad Abou Greisha
Dawod Abou Greisha
Ibrahim Abou Greisha
Ismail Abou Greisha
Mohammed Abou Greisha
Mohammed Mohsen Abou Greisha
Mohammed Salah Abou Greisha
Said Abou Greisha
Salah Abou Greisha
Yousif Abou Greisha

Ultras

One of the Largest Supporter Groups, ultras, is called Ultras Yellow Dragons 07''. One of the biggest Ultras groups in Africa, which was created in 2007. The supporters are usually fans from the region of the Suez canal and their subsequent relocation due to the Suez crisis, which caused tensions with fellow Cairo club Al-Ahly SC.
They sit in the north curve behind the goal, where they call it Curva Nord. Ismaily SC's Fans are well-known of their loyalty to their club , although The club couldn't achieve any trophy since the last Egyptian league trophy in 2002 they show their full support in every single game they had the opportunity to see the match from the stadium , from coffee shops or even behind TV's in another word they always have their club's back .

Sponsors 
Kit Sponsors : Jako

Official Sponsor : Telecom Egypt

Mobile Phone Sponsor : OPPO Electronics

Automotive Sponsor : Senova

References

http://www.ismaily-sc.com/home/index.php/the_waroncairo/28912.html

External links
Official Website
Official Facebook
Official Twitter

 
Association football clubs established in 1924
Football clubs in Egypt
1924 establishments in Egypt
Sports clubs in Egypt
Clubs and societies in Egypt
CAF Champions League winning clubs